Memmert is a small East Frisian island off the northern coast of Germany, with an area of .  Memmert is uninhabited, with only one house on the island for wildlife-spotting purposes. Occasionally, some guests from the neighboring islands visit Memmert for recreation. Memmert is officially a wildlife protected area.

The island plays an important role in Erskine Childers's novel The Riddle of the Sands (1903).

Notable people

References

External links

East Frisian Islands
Islands of Lower Saxony
Uninhabited islands of Germany